NSDF is the National Student Drama Festival in the UK.

NSDF may also refer to:

 National Slum Dwellers Federation, in India
 National Salvation Democratic Front, a Romanian political party created by Ion Iliescu
 National Space Defense Force, in the 1998 video game Battlezone
National Social Democratic Front in Vietnam